Soraya M. Coley is the 6th president of California State Polytechnic University, Pomona (Cal Poly Pomona or Cal Poly). Prior to this appointment on February 5, 2016, Coley was Provost and Vice President for Academic Affairs at California State University, Bakersfield. Coley is the first Cal Poly female president.
She holds a A.B., Sociology, The Lincoln University, an M.A., Social Planning and Social Research, Bryn Mawr College, and a Ph.D., Social Planning and Policy, Bryn Mawr College.

References

Presidents of California State Polytechnic University, Pomona
Living people
Place of birth missing (living people)
Lincoln University (Pennsylvania) alumni
Bryn Mawr College alumni
California State University, Bakersfield faculty
Women heads of universities and colleges
1950 births